Choristoneura spaldingana is a species of moth of the family Tortricidae. It is found in the United States, where it has been recorded from California and Utah.

References

Moths described in 1962
Choristoneura